Viy 2: Journey to China, released in English-speaking countries as Iron Mask or The Iron Mask, is a 2019 Russian-Chinese fantasy adventure film, directed by Oleg Stepchenko.  It is the sequel to Viy, a 2014 film loosely based on the Nikolai Gogol story Viy. Produced by Gleb Fetisov, Alexey A. Petrukhin and Sergey Sozanovskiy, the film is directed by Oleg Stepchenko from a screenplay by Stepchenko, Petrukhin and Dmitri Palees. The film stars Jason Flemyng and Charles Dance (who reprise their roles from the first film), Rutger Hauer, Jackie Chan, Arnold Schwarzenegger, and Helen Yao.

Viy 2: Journey to China was released in China on 16 August 2019 by Universal Pictures.

Plot
Set in the 18th century, the film follows the continuing exploits of cartographer Jonathan Green as he undertakes a scientific and supernatural journey that leads him from England to China.

Along the way, he discovers Russian Tzar Peter I in prison in the Tower of London under the watch of pugilistic Warden Hook, as his wife Lady Emma discovers the Chinese Princess posing as Jonathan's assistant Chen-Lan.

As Tzar Peter escapes and joins a Russian ship, he tails Lady Emma as she uncovers an imposter robbing the Chinese people while posing as Princess Chen-Lan.

Cast

 Jason Flemyng as Jonathan Green
 Helen Yao as Cheng Lan 
 Yuri Kolokolnikov as Peter the Great
 Anna Churina as Miss Dudley
 Charles Dance as Lord Dudley
 Rutger Hauer as The Ambassador
 Jackie Chan as Master Et Al
 Arnold Schwarzenegger as Captain James Hook
 Martin Klebba as Captain
 Christopher Fairbank as Grey
 Igor Jijikine as Dead Cossack
 Robert Gilabert Cuenca as Tower Guard

Production

Casting
On 5 April 2015, a press conference was held in Moscow with producers Alexey Petrukhin and Sergei Selyanov, actors Jason Flemyng, Rutger Hauer, and Helen Yao. During the conference, it was confirmed that the filming of the sequel, titled Viy 2: Journey to China, has been started.

Major film stars were planned to appear in the sequel. Initial reports had Jackie Chan, Jason Statham, and Steven Seagal as appearing in the film. In November 2016, it was confirmed that Chan would co-star alongside Arnold Schwarzenegger.

Release

Theatrical
The release of Viy 2 in Russia was to be held on 16 August 2018, but subsequently the premiere was postponed to 19 September 2019 while pending censorship approval in China. After the completion of the regulation of issues, the film premiered in China on 16 August 2019.

Viy 2 was released in the Philippines on 20 September 2019 as The Dragon Seal by Pioneer Films.

The film was released in the United Kingdom under the title The Iron Mask on 10 April 2020.

Home media
The film was digitally released on demand and on DVD in the United States as Iron Mask on 24 November 2020.

Reception

Critical response
The website's critics consensus reads: "Iron Mask unites Jackie Chan and Arnold Schwarzenegger for a bizarrely misguided adventure that aims for epic fantasy with unintentionally hilarious results." At Metacritic, which calculated a weighted average score of 32/100 based on 4 reviews, the film received "generally unfavorable reviews".

Ignatiy Vishnevetsky of The A.V. Club gave the film a grade C+, saying that "two-thirds of [the film] is funny on purpose" but that it was "eventually dragged down by compounding inertia."
Al Horner of  Empire Magazine gave it 2 out of 5 and wrote: "It could have been a tantalising coming-together of two icons of action cinema. Instead, The Iron Mask feels oddly anemic."
Peter Bradshaw of the Guardian gave it 2 out of 5 and wrote: "We are stuck with endless, weightless green-screen shenanigans involving a dragon whose eyelashes are used to create tea (I think that's right) and a cast of thousands who drift across various CGI landscapes."

Accolades
Arnold Schwarzenegger was nominated at the 41st Golden Raspberry Awards for Worst Supporting Actor.

Sequel
A sequel, entitled Viy 3: Travel to India, will be released in 2023.

Notes

References

External links
 
 

2019 films
2010s fantasy adventure films
2019 multilingual films
China Film Group Corporation films
Chinese fantasy adventure films
Chinese multilingual films
Chinese supernatural horror films
English-language Chinese films
English-language Russian films
Films based on Russian folklore
Films set in the Qing dynasty
Films shot in China
Russian fantasy adventure films
Russian multilingual films
Russian sequel films
Russian supernatural horror films
2010s Russian-language films
2010s supernatural horror films
2010s English-language films
Films based on Viy (story)
Russian dark fantasy films